Dale Derkatch (born October 17, 1964) is a Canadian retired professional ice hockey centre. He is currently an amateur scout for the Regina Pats of the Western Hockey League (WHL).

Playing career
Derkatch played junior hockey for the Regina Pats of the Western Hockey League, during which he was drafted by the Edmonton Oilers in the 1983 NHL Entry Draft, 140th overall in the 7th round. Derkatch never signed with the Oilers however and instead he spent his entire professional career in Europe. He began his professional career in 1984 in Serie A in Italy, playing for HC Bolzano and HC Asiago before spending three seasons in Finland's SM-liiga for Ilves.

In 1989, Derkatch moved to the Eishockey-Bundesliga in Germany, playing for EC Hedos München for one season before signing for Sportbund DJK Rosenheim. He then had a brief spell in the Nationalliga A in Switzerland for Zürcher SC in 1992 before returning to Germany with Düsseldorfer EG. He rejoined Hedos München in 1993 before the team changed its name to Maddogs München for the inaugural Deutsche Eishockey Liga season. The team would ultimately cease operations before the season finished and Derkatch finished the year in the 2nd Bundesliga with SC Riessersee. After another season in DEL with Kaufbeurer Adler in 1995, Derkatch returned to SC Riessersee for two seasons before retiring in 1998.

Post-playing career
After his retirement, Derkatch was hired by the Washington Capitals as a scout in 1998. In 2008, Derkatch became head coach of the Regina Pats, lasting just one season before becoming skills coach and director of hockey personnel with the Prince Albert Raiders. In 2015, Derkatch became an amateur scout for the Toronto Maple Leafs.

Career statistics

Regular season and playoffs

International

Awards
Bob Brownridge Memorial Trophy (WHL leading scorer) - 1983
 WHL First All-Star Team – 1983

References

External links

info from Hockey Draft Central

1964 births
Living people
Asiago Hockey 1935 players
Athol Murray College of Notre Dame alumni
Bolzano HC players
Edmonton Oilers draft picks
Eishockey-Bundesliga players
Ilves players
Kaufbeurer Adler players
Mad Dogs München players
Manitoba Bisons ice hockey players
Regina Pats coaches
Regina Pats players
SC Riessersee players
Starbulls Rosenheim players
Ice hockey people from Winnipeg
Toronto Maple Leafs scouts
Washington Capitals scouts
ZSC Lions players
Canadian ice hockey centres
Canadian expatriate ice hockey players in Italy
Canadian expatriate ice hockey players in Finland
Canadian expatriate ice hockey players in Switzerland
Canadian ice hockey coaches